Inspired by traveling carnivals of the 1930s, Carnivàle Lune Bleue is a live entertainment event created in Ottawa, Canada by Executive Producer and Founder Wayne Van De Graaff. Van De Graaff has stated that he was inspired to pursue his lifelong dream and recreate a vintage Depression-era carnival after watching the HBO series Carnivàle.

Carnivàle Lune Bleue made its world debut in Ottawa, Ontario, Canada on July 31, 2008 (special media sneak preview night) and officially opened to the public for an initial month-long run on August 1, 2008. In 2009, Carnivale Lune Bleue performed from July 23 - August 30 at Hog's Back Park in Ottawa, Ontario, Canada. The opening weekend of the 2009 performance featured a special appearance by Adrienne Barbeau who played Ruthie the Snake Dancer in Carnivàle, the HBO series.

Carnivàle Lune Bleue has been described as "offering a visceral peek into the life of a Depression-era road show."

Creation
Carnivàle Lune Bleue is the creation of Wayne Van De Graaff, a former international tax and human resources expert who wanted to pay homage to and resurrect the Depression-era traveling carnivals he recalls hearing about from his grandparents while growing up in Utah.

In developing Carnivàle Lune Bleue, Van De Graaff recruited an international team of circus and carnival advisors, including Johnny Meah who is fondly known as "The Czar of Bizarre" and famous for his work as a carnival advisor and historical consultant for the HBO show Carnivàle", Claude Le Belle who was one of Cirque du Soleil's first "Tent Masters" and now owns his own company (http://www.sollertia.ca/), Jan-Rok Achard, an internationally renowned circus historian who was instrumental in founding the National Circus School in Montreal (http://www.nationalcircusschool.ca/en/home), Gilles Renaud who worked with the Montreal International Jazz Festival and other entertainment ventures, Holde Unverzagt who painted numerous show fronts and banners for amusement parks and carnivals, and Jim Conklin of Conklin Show's - the largest amusement show provider in Canada since the 1920s (http://conklinshows.com/), to create the most lifelike and authentic old-fashioned carnival experience.

Piece by piece, Wayne Van De Graaff sought out the essential elements to create Carnivàle Lune Bleue. He is adamant that every aspect of the event be as authentic as possible, "We have a spectacular 1938 Allen Herschell three-abreast wooden carousel and the first ever Big Top used by Cirque du Soleil," he explains. "Every tent on the grounds is an authentic recreation of the canvas tents not used or seen since the 1940s."

History of traveling carnivals
Throughout the late 19th Century up to the middle of the 20th century, North America enjoyed the entertainment of traveling carnivals. These carnivals featured circus-style performances, vaudeville or burlesque shows, games of skill and chance, freak shows, sideshows, fortune tellers, and rides such as the carousel and Ferris wheel. Carnivals became particularly popular during the depression years, sometimes known as the "Dirty Thirties," and by 1937 it is estimated that more than 300 carnivals were touring North America.

The carnival would seemingly "blow" unpredictably into town, setting up in empty farmland on the edge of a community and transforming the field into an ocean of colourful tents and banners overnight. Without warning, after several weeks, the carnies would tear down and pack up, heading back to the sawdust trail to seek out their next location.

Attractions

Carnivàle Lune Bleue 2008 and 2009 lineup featured the following main attractions:

Big Top main event ft. Cirque Maroc
The main event is the Cirque Maroc performance in the Vintage Big Top canvas tent. This show features internationally trained circus artists and former Cirque du Soleil trained performers in a 70-minute showcase of acrobatics, trapeze, contortionism, juggling, aerial rope and other such feats inspired by Depression-era circus, cabaret, burlesque and vaudeville shows. The Big Top used for the Cirque Maroc performance is in itself a piece of circus history in that it was the first tent ever used by Cirque du Soleil

Cirque Maroc is produced specifically for Carnivàle Lune Bleue by Production Éclats de Rire (Artistic Directors and Administrators: Nicolette Hazewinkel & Rodrigue Tremblay; Production Manager: Gilles Renaud; Director: Pierre Potvin).

Ten-in-One freak show ft. Carnival Diablo
An homage to the freak shows of the original traveling circuses, the Ten-in-One show features acts such as fire-eating, sword swallowing, and the human dartboard. The freak show also involves a guillotine and an electric chair, an act that leaves audiences with "clasped hands over gaping mouths and (holding) their collective breath in awe."

The Ten-in-One show is produced for Carnivàle Lune Bleue by Scott McClelland of Carnival Diablo (a successful Canadian touring freak show). McClelland has deep roots in the industry and enthusiastically signed on to perform his show in the old-style carnival revival, as his grandfather was involved with the largest traveling circus sideshow in Canada from 1920 to 1968. The show features McClelland himself as "Nikolai Diablo", Sword Swallower Extraordianire; István Betyár, Countess Vanessa and the Illustrated Strongman; The Mighty Leviticus.

Tropical Terrors: Great Snakes of the World
The Tropical Terrors: Great Snakes of the Word show features snakes and bugs from all over the world, including a giant rock python. There are also boa constrictors, anacondas, spiders, rattlers and other types of pythons, all available in a space-controlled, interactive environment. The Tropical Terrors show is produced for Carnivàle Lune Bleue by Little Ray's Reptile Zoo (the largest reptile rescue group in Canada and a successful touring zoo across Eastern Ontario).

The Magical Midway
Carnivàle Lune Bleue also features original, restored carnival rides, including a 1938 Allan Herschell Company vintage carousel and a 1917 Eli Bridge No. 5 Ferris wheel. For safety reasons, seatbelts were installed and the original gasoline engine that ran the Ferris wheel has been replaced with an electric one. The Magical Midway also includes a clairvoyant caravan, a variety of carnival games of skill, a Banner Line (a large art exhibit of carnival banners), a Grab Joint and Candy Joint (with classic carnival drinks and candies), and a vintage 1920s high striker.

The Congress of Wonders Museum
The one-of-a-kind Congress of Wonders tented exhibit features numerous artifacts, images and displays from the golden age of traveling carnivals including a freaks photo gallery, the infamous Turtle Boy, a genuine bed of nails and the Jersey Devil. The Congress of Wonders Museum
is presented by the North American Carnival Museum and Archives (http://www.nacma.org).

The Cookhouse
A full-service restaurant that pays tribute to classic cuisine from the 1930s is also part of Carnivàle Lune Bleue. The Cookhouse features an open kitchen (built on site specifically for the performance run) and a host of dishes that were popular during the Great Depression.

Future performances
The carnival's founder, Wayne Van De Graaff, planned to take the show on the road in future years, making it a real, traveling carnival.

References

External links

Entertainment companies of Canada
Traveling carnivals